Bedii Süheyl Batum (born 6 May 1955) is a Turkish professor of constitutional law, political scientist, columnist and Kemalist politician who had served as the Member of Parliament for Eskişehir from June 2011 to June 2015. He was the former rector of Bahçeşehir University.

Biography
He is Georgian descent, and was born on 6 May 1955 in Istanbul. Having finished his high school education at Galatasaray High School in 1975, he attended the faculty of law at the University of Paris, and graduated in 1979. Batum received his Doctor of Laws degree in 1986. Following his postdoctoral studies in international law, particularly in  human rights, he became professor in 1996. Since 1993, Batum  lectured constitutional law at a number of universities in Istanbul such as Istanbul University, Marmara University, Yeditepe University, Istanbul Bilgi University, Galatasaray University and now he is lecturing in Bahçeşehir University. He is now a member of the current Republican People's Party (Turkish: Cumhuriyet Halk Partisi) in Turkey. He was appointed as the Secretary General of the Party. However, surprisingly, he is appointed as the deputy of the party leader.

References

External links 
 Facebook Fan Page
 Republican People's Party Official Web Site
 Batum In Grand National Assembly Of Turkey

Turkish non-fiction writers
Turkish legal scholars
1955 births
Politicians from Istanbul
Academic staff of Istanbul University
Living people
Academic staff of Bahçeşehir University
Galatasaray High School alumni
University of Paris alumni
Rectors of universities and colleges in Turkey
Turkish people of Georgian descent
Members of the 24th Parliament of Turkey
Turkish expatriates in France
Academic staff of Marmara University
Academic staff of Yeditepe University
Academic staff of Istanbul Bilgi University
Academic staff of Galatasaray University